Jamāl ibn ‘Abd Allāh Shaykh ‘Umar al-Ḥanafī al-Makkī (d. 14 February 1868) was an Islamic scholar and teacher in the Masjid al-Haram who served as Shaykh al-Ulama from 1264 AH (1847/1848) and Hanafi Mufti of Mecca from 1281 AH (1864/1865), until his death in 1868.

Life
Born in Mecca, he initially studied under Shaykh Siddiq Kamal. He attended the lessons of Allamah Umar Abd Rabb ar-Rasul and Allamah Sayyid Yahya al-Mu'adhdhin. He became a pupil of Shaykh Abd Allah Siraj and completed his studies under him. After the death of Siraj in 1264 AH (1864/1865) he was appointed to the post of Shaykh al-Ulama. He was appointed Mufti al-Ahnaf (Mufti of the Hanafis) after the death of Shaykh Muhammad Husayn Kutubi in 1281 AH (1847/1848).

His students included Shaykh Abd ar-Rahman Siraj, Shaykh Mirdad Abu al-Khayr, Shaykh Hasan Tayyib, Shaykh Abd al-Malik al-Fattani, Shaykh Abd ar-Rahman al-Ujaymi, Shaykh Sulayman Utbi, and Shaykh Abd al-Qadir Shams.

Shaykh Jamal died in Mecca on Friday, 19 Shawwal 1284 AH (14 February 1868), after sunrise. His funeral prayer was performed at the door of the Kaaba after Asr prayer. Sharif Abd Allah was in attendance. He was buried in the vicinity of the tomb of Khadijah in Jannat al-Mu'alla.

During the British Raj, the following Muftis (the persons who issue decrees on religious affairs, mostly appointed by the Government) of Mecca also issued decrees to the effect that going to war against the British Government in India by the Indian Muslims was not lawful. These Muftis are:

1. Jamal ibn Abd Allah Shaykh Umar.

2. Hussain bin Ibrahim Maliki.

3. Ahmad bin Zuhri Shafi’i.

Abd ar-Rahman Siraj succeeded him as Mufti and Ahmad Zayni Dahlan succeeded him as Shaykh al-Ulama.

His written works include:
Risalah fi fada'il laylat an-nisf min Sha'ban
Manaqib as-sadah al-Badriyin
Manaqib Abd ar-Rahman ibn Abi Bakr as-Siddiq
Manaqib Khalid ibn al-Walid
al-Faraj ba'd ash-shiddah fi tarikh Jiddah
al-Manhaj al-a'dal fi ba'd manaqib as-Sayyid 'Ali al-Ahdal
Nur al-Jamal 'ala jawab as-su'al

Notes

References

1868 deaths
People from Mecca
Saudi Arabian Sunni Muslims
Muftis of Mecca
Burials at Jannat al-Mu'alla